A sandal-bearer is a person who bears the sandals of his superior. The role existed in various cultures and epochs, being first documented in Egypt's Early Dynastic Period (c. 31st century BC).

In Antiquity 

In Ancient Egypt the role of sandal-bearer was documented for the first time in history. A sandal-bearer is depicted on the Narmer Macehead, as well as on both sides of the Narmer Palette, in which he is identified by a rosette and a club as the servant of the king.
Based on interpretations of these depictions, the sandal-bearer was possibly a high-ranking official, accompanying the pharaoh on important occasions. In addition to carrying the sandals, the sandal-bearer would also perform the ancient practice of washing the king's feet.

In Medieval times 

Sandal-bearers also existed in Feudal Japan, being a position of relatively high status. Probably the most famous person to take on this role in Japan was Toyotomi Hideyoshi, during the Sengoku period. Being of humble origins, around 1557 he joined the Oda clan, then headed by Oda Nobunaga, as a lowly servant. He became one of Nobunaga's sandal-bearers and was present at the Battle of Okehazama in 1560 when Nobunaga defeated Imagawa Yoshimoto to become one of the most powerful warlords in the Sengoku period. After the death of Nobunaga, he secured a succession of high imperial court titles including, in 1585, the prestigious position of kanpaku (regent).

References 

Obsolete occupations
Sandals